These are the official results of the Women's 10,000 metres event at the 1994 European Championships in Helsinki, Finland. The final was held at Helsinki Olympic Stadium on 13 August 1994.

Medalists

Final

Participation
According to an unofficial count, 21 athletes from 15 countries participated in the event.

 (1)
 (1)
 (1)
 (1)
 (1)
 (3)
 (1)
 (1)
 (1)
 (3)
 (2)
 (2)
 (1)
 (1)
 (1)

See also
 1990 Women's European Championships 10,000 metres (Split)
 1991 Women's World Championships 10,000 metres (Tokyo)
 1992 Women's Olympic 10,000 metres (Barcelona)
 1993 Women's World Championships 10,000 metres (Stuttgart)
 1995 Women's World Championships 10,000 metres (Gothenburg)
 1996 Women's Olympic 10,000 metres (Atlanta)
 1997 Women's World Championships 10,000 metres (Athens)
 1998 Women's European Championships 10,000 metres (Budapest)

References

 Results

10000
10,000 metres at the European Athletics Championships
Marathons in Finland
1994 in women's athletics